Persinger Creek is a stream in the U.S. state of West Virginia.

Persinger Creek was named after the local Persinger family.

See also
List of rivers of West Virginia

References

Rivers of Nicholas County, West Virginia
Rivers of West Virginia